Benjamin Shaw Wood (born 25 January 1971) is an English former first-class cricketer.

Wood was born at Dewsbury in January 1971. He later studied at the University of Oxford at Worcester College. While studying at Oxford, he played first-class cricket for Oxford University, making his debut against Hampshire in 1991. He played first-class cricket for Oxford until 1992, making a total of twelve appearances. Playing as a right-arm medium-fast bowler, he took 16 wickets at a high average of 63.56 and with best figures of 2 for 24. A tailend batsman, he scored 24 runs with a high score of 13. In addition to playing first-class cricket for Oxford University, he also made a single appearance for a combined Oxford and Cambridge Universities team against the touring Pakistanis in 1992.

References

External links

1971 births
Living people
People from Dewsbury
Alumni of Worcester College, Oxford
English cricketers
Oxford University cricketers
Oxford and Cambridge Universities cricketers